Victoria River Downs Airport  is an airport in Victoria River in the  Northern Territory of Australia which serves the Victoria River Downs Station.

See also
 List of airports in the Northern Territory

References

Airports in the Northern Territory